Mohamed Ahmed Ramadan Ibrahim Ahmed known as Mohamed Ramadan (born 9 August 1995 in Cairo, Egypt) is an international karate athlete from Egypt who is playing for Egypt national Karate team, Al-Ahly Sporting Club and Spn Vernon French Club, He won several medals in international championships including World, Continental and Karate1.

Career 
He started his career in karate Since he was 4 years old in Al-Ahly Sporting Club in Egypt then he was doing kata and kumite together till 2005 and then he decided to specialize in kumite (Contact fighting in karate) in 2006. He obtained his first bronze national medal in 2007 then he became national champion in 2009 and he was only 14 years old. then he joined the national team of Egypt in 2013, and he obtained his first medal in senior's category (-75 kg) in a major international championship at Karate1 Premier League in 2014 and he was only 18 years old in "Pierre-de-Coubertin" stadium in Paris then he got a serious injury in his shoulder and that prevented him from finishing the season. and then he came back in 2015 and He won his first world title in the World Championship U21 in addition to gold medal in the Mediterranean championship and silver medal in Open Dubai. in 2016 he got another injury again but this time in his wrist that needed an operation and that prevented him from finishing the season and affected his level badly in 2017 which made him without any world ranking cause he lost all of his world ranking points because he didn't compete in any championship, then he came back again in 2018 with a new category (-84 kg). in early 2018 he had joined SPN Vernon (French Club) and he returned step by step into the world ranking by winning some series A and premier leagues events in Chile, Shanghai.

in January 2019, He got bronze medal in category -84 kg at Karate1 Premier League Paris 2019  then by the end of the year he achieved gold medal in African championship by teams that held in Gaborone, and bronze medal in All African Games in Tangier, Morocco. and after this great achievement of the African Games, he received the order of republic of Egypt the 3rd degree from the president Abd el fattah el sisi.

in January 2020, He won his first gold medal in Karate1 Premier League Paris 2020 then he achieved Silver Medal in the African championship Tangier 2020 in category -84 kg and in teams.

By June 2020, he became 10th in the world ranking (-84 kg) and 19th in the Olympic ranking and 1st between All Africans in Olympic category (+75 kg) and world category (-84 kg).

In June 2021, he competed at the World Olympic Qualification Tournament held in Paris, France hoping to qualify for the 2020 Summer Olympics in Tokyo, Japan. He was eliminated in his Fourth match by Athlete from Kosovo.

He continues his success by Climbing the world Ranking by achieving two bronze medals in Karate1 Premier League Istanbul and Cairo 2021, Silver Medal in Karate1 Premier League Fujairah 2022 and Bronze Medal in Karate1 Premier League Matosinhos 2022 Until he becomes 3rd in the current world ranking -84 kg from July 2022 till January 2023.

In December 2022, he achieved the gold medal in African Championship that had been held in Durban, South Africa, He got gold with Egypt Team in Senior Male team Fights after beating Algeria team in the final 3-0.

in January 2023, he was able to achieve the Grand Winner award from World Karate Federation to declare that he is the best in category -84kg of season 2022 in Karate1 events, and it's mandatory to achieve this award to get the highest points in Karate1 Premier League Standing and to Participate at least in 4 events out 5 events during the season according to WKF rules 2022, after this season he reached the 2nd place in the world ranking in the February 2023.

International Awards 
He achieved the Grand Winner for season 2022 in Category -84 kg from World Karate Federation to declare that he is the best of the best in Karate1 Premier League events.

International competitions

References

External links 

Egyptian male karateka
1995 births
Living people
Sportspeople from Cairo
African Games bronze medalists for Egypt
African Games medalists in karate
Competitors at the 2019 African Games
20th-century Egyptian people
21st-century Egyptian people